Yvonne Meusburger was the defending champion, but lost in the second round to Bianca Botto.

Anastasija Sevastova won the title defeating Ana Savić in the final by walkover.

Seeds

Draw

Finals

Top half

Bottom half

References 
Main Draw
Qualifying Draw

Empire Trnava Cup - Singles